Onitis humerosus is a species of Scarabaeidae or scarab beetles in the superfamily Scarabaeoidea.

Description
Body is oval and convex. The pronotum is densely punctured. It may be bright metallic green, coppery, indigo-blue or violet, while the elytra are bright yellow, finely striate, with longitudinal, green or blue lines. The sides of the metasternum are very hairy.

Distribution
This species has a Palaearctic distribution (East Mediterranean, Caucasus, Southern East Ukraine, Turkestan, Afghanistan, Pakistan, Cyprus)

References

External links
 Onitis humerosus Pallas - photos by S.A. Neporotovskiy

Scarabaeidae
Beetles described in 1771
Taxa named by Peter Simon Pallas